The David Smaill House, at 313 W. Ann St. in Carson City, Nevada, was built in c.1876.  Also known as the Smaill House, it was listed on the National Register of Historic Places in 1985.

It was deemed significant "for its associations with the early residential development of Carson City, Nevada", according to its NRHP nomination, which went on to note:  "The dwelling is representative of the small, vernacular dwellings associated with Carson City's working class in the late 19th century. The building is architecturally noteworthy for its simplicity of design and elaborate exterior ornamentation."  The original house was built by Smaill at least partway during 1876 and then sold by Smaill in 1877, though David and Rachel Spratte Smaill lived there up to 1879 at least.

References

External links

Gothic Revival architecture in Nevada
Historic American Buildings Survey in Nevada
Houses completed in 1876
Houses on the National Register of Historic Places in Nevada
National Register of Historic Places in Carson City, Nevada
Queen Anne architecture in Nevada
Houses in Carson City, Nevada
Working-class culture in the United States